Chamada a Cobrar is a 2012 Brazilian thriller film written and directed by Anna Muylaert. The film is an offshoot of the television film Para Aceitá-la Continue na Linha produced for TV Cultura in 2010. It was selected as hours-concours for the Première Brasil of the 2012 Festival do Rio.

Plot
The film tells the story of Clara, a lady of high society in São Paulo that falls in a fake kidnapping scam and is guided by the voice of the criminal in the following 12 hours, following by roads that lead up to the suburb of Rio de Janeiro. In this way, she will be extorted up to the limit of her credit card.

Cast
Cida Almeida as Dalva
Maria Manoela as Cristina
Lourenço Mutarelli as Delegado
Pierre Santos as Vladmir
Tatiana Thomé as Adriana

References

External links 
 

2012 thriller films
2012 films
Brazilian thriller films
Films directed by Anna Muylaert
Films set in São Paulo
Films set in Rio de Janeiro (city)
2010s Portuguese-language films